Georgy Tumanov ((Giorgi Tumanishvili)) (16 March 1839 – 30 May 1901) was member of the Georgian-Armenian royal house of Tumanishvili. He served as General of the Infantry as well as theorist and practitioner of military engineering in the Russian Empire. Tumanov was one of the most important specialists in that area at the time. He wrote numerous manuals for pioneer units on how to properly construct fortifications and other relevant military infrastructure.

Awards
Order of Saint Anna, 3rd class, 1864
Order of Saint Vladimir, 4th class, 1864
Order of Saint Vladimir, 3rd class, 1878
Order of Saint Stanislaus (House of Romanov), 2nd class, 1865
Order of Saint Anna, 2nd class, 1874
Order of Saint Stanislaus (House of Romanov), 1st class, 1891
Order of Saint Anna, 1st class, 1899

Sources
 Некрологи:
 «Исторический вестник», 1901 г., т. 85, июль
 «Новое время», 1901 г., № 9075
 Гогитидзе М. Грузинский генералитет (1699—1921). Киев, 2001

1839 births
1901 deaths
People of the Caucasian War
Imperial Russian Army generals
Georgian generals in the Imperial Russian Army
Georgian generals with the rank "General of the Infantry" (Imperial Russia)
Russian military personnel of the Russo-Turkish War (1877–1878)
Recipients of the Order of St. Anna, 3rd class
Recipients of the Order of St. Vladimir, 4th class
Recipients of the Order of St. Vladimir, 3rd class
Recipients of the Order of Saint Stanislaus (Russian), 2nd class
Recipients of the Order of St. Anna, 2nd class
Recipients of the Order of Saint Stanislaus (Russian), 1st class
Recipients of the Order of St. Anna, 1st class